The bologna sandwich is a sandwich common in the United States and Canada. Also known as a baloney sandwich, it is traditionally made from sliced bologna sausage between slices of white bread, along with various condiments, such as mayonnaise, mustard, and ketchup.

The bologna sandwich is a regional specialty in the East, Midwest, Appalachia, and the South. It is a sandwich served at lunch counters of small, family-run markets that surround the Great Smoky Mountains, and fried bologna sandwiches can be found on restaurant menus in many places in the South. The fried version is likewise sometimes sold at concession stands in stadiums, like those of the Cincinnati Reds. In Pittsburgh, Pennsylvania, it is called "jumbo". In Knoxville, Tennessee, the sandwich is referred to in local slang as a "Lonsdale ham" sandwich, after the less-affluent neighborhood of Lonsdale in Knoxville.

Many variations exist, including frying the meat first and adding various garnishes such as cheese slices, pickles, tomatoes, and onions.

See also 
 Mortadella sandwich
 List of sandwiches

References 

American sandwiches
Cuisine of the Midwestern United States
Sandwiches